The 1950 Isle of Man Tourist Trophy festival was the second year the Isle of Man TT races were part of the Grand Prix World Championship. 

After his win in the 1949 Isle of Man Clubman event, Geoff Duke entered the 1950 Isle of Man TT only to find himself racing against formidable opposition in his first Senior TT, not only from his experienced Norton team mates, Artie Bell, Harold Daniell and Johnny Lockett, but also Les Graham on an AJS Porcupine, Reg Armstrong and Bob Foster on Velocettes. Geoff was wearing a new set of one-piece leathers and he beat them all, breaking both lap and race records in the Senior, and finishing second in the Junior TT.  It was the beginning of a spectacular racing career for Geoff Duke.

The Norton team had the new Featherbed frame on their racing bikes that had excellent handing characteristics. It was another Norton ridden by Artie Bell that won the Junior, with Norton occupying the first three places of the Senior and Junior races. The Lightweight TT went to the Italian bikes, with first and second being Dario Ambrosini on a Benelli, and Maurice Cann on a Moto Guzzi, respectively. 

As in 1949, four Clubman races were included in this year's festival; Clubman 1,000 cc, Clubman Senior, Clubman Junior and Clubman Lightweight.

1950 Isle of Man Senior TT 500cc final standings
1950 – 6 Laps (236.38 Miles) Mountain Course.

Sources

External links
1950 Isle of Man TT race results

Isle of Man Tt
Isle of Man Tt
Isle of Man TT
Isle of Man TT